Herbert James Draper (–) was an English Neoclassicist painter whose career began in the Victorian era and extended through the first two decades of the 20th century.

Life 
Born in London, the son of a fruit merchant named John James Draper and his wife Emma, he was educated at Bruce Castle School in Tottenham and then went on to study art at the Royal Academy.  He undertook several educational trips to Rome and Paris between 1888 and 1892, having won the Royal Academy Gold Medal and Travelling Studentship in 1889. In the 1890s, he worked as an illustrator, eventually settling in London. In 1891, he married Ida (née Williams), with whom he had a daughter, Yvonne.  He died of arteriosclerosis at the age of 56, in his home on Abbey Road.

Career 

Draper's most productive period began in 1894. He focused mainly on mythological themes from ancient Greece. His painting The Lament for Icarus (1898) won the gold medal at the Exposition Universelle in Paris in 1900 and was later bought for the Tate Gallery by the Chantrey Trustees.  He was also responsible for the decoration of the ceiling of the Drapers' Hall in the City of London.  Though Draper was neither a member nor an associate of the Royal Academy, he took part in the annual expositions from 1890 on. In later years as the public tastes changed and mythological scenes became less popular he concentrated more on portraits.

During his lifetime Draper was quite famous, a well-known portrait painter. In his last years, his popularity faded, though there has recently been a revival of interest in his work on the art market.  The sale of his painting The Sea Maiden by the Royal Cornwall Museum in 2010, to help secure its finances, generated debate about the policy of disposing of art works for this purpose.

Gallery

Notes

Further reading 
Toll, Simon: Herbert Draper 1863–1920: A Life Study (Antique Collector's Club; 2003).

External links 

H J Draper (Victorian Web)
H J Draper online (ArtCyclopedia)
 Works by H J Draper (Tate Gallery)
H J Draper (Art Renewal Center)
 
 

1863 births
1920 deaths
19th-century English painters
English male painters
20th-century English painters
Alumni of St John's Wood Art School
English illustrators
Mythological painters
People educated at Bruce Castle School
English portrait painters
Painters from London
20th-century English male artists
19th-century English male artists